Headingley Stadium is a stadium complex in Headingley, Leeds, West Yorkshire, England, comprising two separate grounds, Headingley Cricket Ground and Headingley Rugby Stadium, linked by a two-sided stand housing common facilities. The grounds are the respective homes of Yorkshire County Cricket Club (CCC) and Leeds Rhinos rugby league club. Initially, it was owned by the Leeds Cricket, Football and Athletic Company (Leeds Rhinos); however, since 2006, the cricket ground has been owned by Yorkshire CCC, with the rugby ground retained by Leeds CF & A. The two organisations jointly manage the complex.

From 2006 until 2017, the stadium was officially known as the Headingley Carnegie Stadium as a result of sponsorship from Leeds Metropolitan University, whose sports faculty is known as the Carnegie School of Sport Exercise and Physical Education. Between 1 November 2017 and 3 November 2021, the stadium was known as the Emerald Headingley Stadium due to the purchase of the naming rights by Emerald Group Publishing. The Emerald Group later withdrew their sponsorship of the ground effective immediately on 3 November 2021 due to Yorkshire County Cricket Club's alleged insufficient response to allegations of racism made by former player Azeem Rafiq.

Cricket ground

The cricket ground sits on the northern side of the complex.  It opened in 1891 and has been used for Test matches since 1899.  It is the main home ground of the Yorkshire County Cricket Club and Yorkshire Vikings Twenty20 cricket team.  The ground last hosted The Ashes in 2019.  Since 2015, the cricket ground has been floodlit.  The ground has a seated capacity of 18,350, executive facilities and a new media centre opened in 2010.  All but the stand at the football ground end have been rebuilt since 2000, it is proposed to replace this stand in conjunction with redeveloping its other side facing the rugby ground.

Owning the ground
In December 2005, Yorkshire County Cricket Club obtained a loan of £9 million from Leeds City Council towards the cost of purchasing the cricket ground for £12 million. Shortly afterwards, 98.37% of members who participated in a vote backed the deal. On 11 January 2006, the club announced plans to rebuild the stand next to the rugby ground with 3,000 extra seats, taking capacity to 20,000. The club also announced plans to redevelop the Winter Shed (North) stand on 25 August 2006 providing a £12.5 million pavilion complex.

Rugby ground

The rugby ground sits on the southern side of the complex.  Historically a rugby league ground, the home of Leeds Rhinos, it now hosts some rugby union games. The ground consists of three stands and an open terrace at one end. One stand is completely seated, and two are a mixture of seating and standing.  The stadium has a capacity of 19,700.

In 2018, a new, modern South Stand, sponsored by brewer Tetley's, was opened. A new North Stand, the Emerald Stand, was opened in 2019.

Future developments

Yorkshire County Cricket Club have shown keen interest in redeveloping the northern side of the ground.  This is a major inconvenience to Leeds Rugby Limited as they wish to redevelop their North Stand, which backs onto the Cricket Ground. As such any redevelopment of this stand cannot go ahead until Yorkshire Cricket are also willing to redevelop their side of the cricket pitch. If Headingley is to retain Test Ground Status, it is likely that further improvements will need to be made to the ground. On 5 June 2014 Yorkshire CCC announced the "Headingley Masterplan". The phased redevelopment costing around £50 million will take place over the next 20 years.

Phase One
Erection of four permanent floodlight pylons. The floodlights, which have light arrays in the shape of the Yorkshire Rose, were installed in 2015. The first full game to be played under them was the T20 match against Derbyshire Falcons on Friday, 15 May 2015, but they were also called upon for the County Championship game against Warwickshire a few weeks earlier.

Phase Two
The rebuild of the Football Ground End, in conjunction with Leeds Rugby, to incorporate a three-tiered seating area, which will accommodate 5,060 seats, enhanced corporate facilities and new permanent concession units.

Phase Three
To incorporate an additional 915 seats to the upper tier of the North East Stand with the possibility of a cantilever roof from the side of the Carnegie Pavilion to the existing scoreboard.

Phase Four
The development of a new Pavilion located in the North West area of the stadium complex. Built on five levels, the Pavilion will be adjacent to the existing Carnegie Pavilion. To include corporate facilities, new dressing rooms for the players and coaching staff, Members’ Long Room and seating and the creation of a main entrance to the stadium on Kirkstall Lane.

Phase Five
The erection of a translucent cantilever roof to cover the White Rose Stand on the western side of the ground.

Phase Six
Landscaping on the White Rose Stand and North East stand concourses.

Yorkshire County Cricket Club and Leeds Metropolitan University have collaborated in building the Headingley Carnegie Pavilion, which replaced 'The Shed' to the northern side of the Cricket Ground (which, dating from the early 1970s, was the oldest surviving structure). The new pavilion replaces 'The Winter Shed' and 'The Media Centre' at the Kirkstall Lane end of the ground, which had become obsolete, according to Yorkshire County Cricket Club, no longer meeting the requirements of modern broadcasting. The changing facilities are replaced by new facilities, designed specifically for cricket, while the new executive boxes will provide the expected level of service.  Yorkshire County Cricket Clubs offices will also be relocated into the pavilion, which boasts environmentally friendly features such as a ground source heat pump and solar hot water heating.

The rugby ground has also been significantly rebuilt since 2006 when the Carnegie Stand at the east end was opened, containing both standing and seated areas, private boxes and catering. In 2017 both the North and South Stands were torn down following Leeds' last home game of the season: the new South Stand will be a two-tier structure similar to the Carnegie Stand with an expanded terrace, while the North Stand's replacement will feature additional executive boxes and facilities for players, staff and media, as well as thousands of new seats for the cricket ground.

Gallery

Cricket Ground

Rugby Stadium

See also

Architecture of Leeds
Cricket (musical)
List of cricket grounds in England and Wales
List of international cricket centuries at Headingley
List of Test cricket grounds
Sport in Leeds

References

External links

New Stand being constructed
Official site of The Yorkshire County Cricket Club
stadium improvements info @ bbc
A rotating 360 degree view of the cricket ground from the BBC
A rotating 360 degree view of the rugby ground from the BBC
Stadium renamed
stadium info @ napit
pictures of rugby ground at a leeds tykes match
pictures of rugby ground
picture of leeds tykes at headingley

 
Rugby league stadiums in England
Rugby League World Cup stadiums
Rugby union stadiums in England
Cricket grounds in West Yorkshire
Sports venues in Leeds
Leeds Tykes
Leeds Rhinos
Yorkshire County Cricket Club
Sports venues completed in 1890